Hauser Kaibling is a ski area located within the Planai ski area.

Mountains of Styria
Ski areas and resorts in Austria
Tourist attractions in Styria
Schladming Tauern